Désirée or Desiree or variation, may refer to:

 Désirée (given name), a female given name

People 
 Des'ree (born 1968), British pop/soul vocalist throughout the 1990s
 Desireé Bassett (born 1992), American hard rock guitarist
 Desiree Burch (born 1979), American comedian and television host.
 Désirée Clary (1777–1860), Queen of Sweden, 1818–1844
 Desireé Cousteau (born 1956), American porn star
 Desiree Gould (1945–2021), American actress
 Desiree Heslop (born 1961),  British singer also known by the stage name Princess
 Desiree Horton (born 1971), nicknamed "Chopper Chick", Los Angeles helicopter pilot/TV reporter and United States Forest Service helicopter firefighter
 Désirée Malonga (born 1981), Afro-Romanian actress and model
 Désirée Nosbusch (born 1965), actress and TV host in Germany
 Desirée Rogers (born 1959), White House Social Secretary
 Desiree Washington (born 1973), beauty pageant contestant
 Desi-Rae Young (born 2002), American basketball player
 Anne Désirée Ouloto (born 1966), Ivorian politician
 Princess Désirée, Baroness Silfverschiöld (born 1937), Swedish princess

Fictional characters
 Desiree DeVere, a fictional former Miss Botswana on comedy sketch Little Britain
 Desiree (Danny Phantom), a villain on the Nickelodeon cartoon Danny Phantom

Arts and entertainment 
 Désirée (film), a 1954 film about Désirée Clary starring Marlon Brando
 Désirée (operetta), an 1884 operetta by John Philip Sousa

Songs 
 "Désiree", a song originally recorded by The Charts in 1957 as "Deserie", and in 1971 recorded by Laura Nyro on the album Gonna Take a Miracle
 "Desiree" (song), a 1977 song by Neil Diamond
 "Desiree", a song by The Left Banke
 "Desiree", a song by American heavy metal band Savatage, released on the 1997 Edel re-release of Streets: A Rock Opera
 "Desiree", a song by Caribou from the album Andorra.
 "Desiree", a song by Mohsen Chavoshi from the album Boatless Oar.

Other 
 Désirée (potato), a red-skinned variety of potato
 Désirée, a white mare ridden by Napoleon during the Waterloo Campaign

See also

 Désiré, a French male given name
 Désiré (baritone), stage name of French comic baritone Amable Courtecuisse (1823–1873)
 
 
 
 
 
 Desire (disambiguation)